György Hlavay (4 January 1888 – 18 July 1958) was a Hungarian footballer. He played in eight matches for the Hungary national football team from 1909 to 1914. He was also part of Hungary's squad for the football tournament at the 1912 Summer Olympics, but he did not play in any matches.

Honours

Player
MTK Budapest
Nemzeti Bajnokság I: 1913–14, 1916–17, 1917–18, 1918–19, 1919–20
Magyar Kupa: 1913–14

Manager
Juventus București
Divizia A: 1929–30

References

External links
 

1888 births
1958 deaths
Footballers from Budapest
Hungarian footballers
Hungary international footballers
Association football midfielders
Nemzeti Bajnokság I players
Nemzeti Bajnokság II players
MTK Budapest FC players
Hungarian football managers
Újpest FC managers
Udinese Calcio managers
FC Petrolul Ploiești managers
S.P.A.L. managers
Brescia Calcio managers
Ferencvárosi TC managers
Hungarian expatriate football managers
Expatriate football managers in Italy
Hungarian expatriate sportspeople in Italy
Expatriate football managers in Romania
Hungarian expatriate sportspeople in Romania